The  Woronora River Bridge, also known as  Woronora Bridge, is a four-lane road bridge that carries River Road across the Woronora River at Woronora, in Southern Sydney, New South Wales, Australia. The bridge, at the time of its completion in 2001, was the largest incrementally launched bridge in the Southern Hemisphere with horizontal and vertical curves.

Description
The Woronora Bridge was built to eliminate the steep grades and hairpin bends on the previous route between the southern Sydney suburbs of Sutherland and Bangor. It was completed in 2001 and replaced the two-lane low level Woronora Bridge which opened in 1981, which in turn had replaced a 1912 single-lane timber bridge. The low level bridge remains in use for local traffic.

There is a grade-separated shared pedestrian footpath and cycleway on the northern side of the bridge, located just underneath the road. It can be accessed from Menai Road on the Bangor side and Prince Edward Park Road or River Road on the Sutherland side of the river.

The bridge's design was recognised with the Australian Construction Achievement Award in 2002. With a downhill grade of 4.7% at the launching abutment, it has one of the steepest downhill launchings of any incrementally launched bridge.

Gallery

See also

 List of bridges in Sydney

References

External links

 Bridge on the Laing O’Rourke website
 Bridge on the Roads & Traffic Authority website
 
 
 
 

Bridges in Sydney
Road bridges in New South Wales
Bridges completed in 2001
Box girder bridges
Concrete bridges in Australia
2001 establishments in Australia